Stephanie Paul is a New Zealand actress and comedian.  She starred as a Sarah Palin-esque United States president in the 2012 film Iron Sky.

Early work
She has been performing on stage since the age of four, and started her professional career as a teenager. She was featured in local commercials, and has since worked her way up from small Tostitos commercials to featuring in hundreds of commercials - including four Super Bowl commercials. Stephanie's ads span seven international markets, and she also works in theatre, film, and television.

Career
Paul is most well known in the 2012 Sci-Fi Comedy Iron Sky and the Iron Sky: Invasion Video Game, released in December 2012, and in both she plays the President of The United States. She reprised the role in the 2017 sequel Iron Sky: The Coming Race.

In 2012, Stephanie Paul was on the list of nominees for best supporting actress at AACTA for her role in Iron Sky, and is also known for her role as Pip Thomas in Tom Scott's Separation City. Additionally, she played the starring lead of Sarah Sloan in Douglas Underdhal's award-winning Film School Confidential.  Stephanie has also been seen in various TV performances on shows such as The Bold and the Beautiful, Street Legal, and Amazing Extraordinary Friends to name a few.

In 1998, she crossed the pond to the United States where she studied at the Neighborhood Playhouse in New York City, home of the Sanford Meisner Technique. In New York, Stephanie earned credits working in theatre and film. Then, in 2001, she moved to San Francisco to continue working in commercials, theatre, film, and TV, and she studied on-camera and monologue techniques with Full Circle Productions. Their technique, derived from screenplay writing, combined character creation from an intellectual point of view with “in the moment” organic techniques.

Stephanie has trained with B.A.T.S, The Groundlings, IO (Improv Olympic), and the Improvatoriumin in Los Angeles, and was a member of Improv Troupe “Gumbo”, performing at the World Famous Comedy Store in West Hollywood. She also spent 2 years studying sketch writing at the Second City in Hollywood. She also directed the entire production of a sketch comedy that she wrote and is currently in development on for a show based on some of her characters as well as another sitcom project. She also has 9 years professional Stand Up under her writing belt from working internationally in 7 countries. Stephanie is also the co-founder of the Hilarious Healing Project, and she continues to thrive and work in both communities helping others achieve inner happiness with laughter, while writing, directing and producing various entertainment projects.

Filmography
 2008: The Frequency of Claire – Maggie
 2009: Separation City – Pip
 2012: Iron Sky – President of the United States
 2013: Rapture-Palooza – Kimberly
 2019: Iron Sky: The Coming Race - President of the United States

References

External links

Living people
New Zealand actresses
New Zealand expatriate actresses in the United States
Year of birth missing (living people)
Place of birth missing (living people)
New Zealand women comedians